James Rolfe (born 1980) is an American filmmaker, actor, and the creator of the web series Angry Video Game Nerd.

James Rolfe may also refer to:
 James Rolfe (composer) (born 1961), Canadian composer
 James Rolfe (legislator) (1821–1888), early member of the Wisconsin State Senate
 Jimmy Rolfe (born 1932), former professional footballer

See also
 James Rolph (1869–1934), 27th governor of California and Mayor of San Francisco